Valentin Marius Alexandru (born 17 September 1991) is a Romanian professional footballer who last time played as a forward for Gloria Buzău. In his career, Alexandru also played for teams such as: Victoria Brănești, SC Popești-Leordeni, SCM Gloria Buzău, Rapid București or Dunărea Călărași , among others.

Honours
Victoria Brănești
Liga II: 2009–10

Dunărea Călărași
Liga II: 2017–18

Chindia Târgoviște
Liga II: 2018–19

Individual
Liga II top scorer: 25 goals 2015–16

References

External links
 
 

1991 births
Living people
Romanian footballers
Association football forwards
Liga I players
Liga II players
CS Brănești players
AFC Săgeata Năvodari players
ASC Daco-Getica București players
CS Otopeni players
LPS HD Clinceni players
FC Dunărea Călărași players
CS Pandurii Târgu Jiu players
CS Concordia Chiajna players
AFC Chindia Târgoviște players
FC Gloria Buzău players
FC Rapid București players
FC Universitatea Cluj players